St. John's Institution (abbreviated SJI) is a public all-boys school (sixth form is co-ed) and is one of the oldest schools in Kuala Lumpur, Malaysia. The school is widely known by its initials SJI and the students of St John's Institution bear the name Johannians.

While it is commonly thought that the school is named after Jean-Baptiste de la Salle, the founder of the De La Salle Christian Brothers Order and also known as the Patron Saint of Teachers; the school actually takes it name from St. John the Evangelist which is the sponsoring parish church/cathedral which is also located nearby on Jalan Bukit Nanas.

SJI consists of a primary school and a secondary school. The primary and secondary schools initially were fee paying missionary schools  and  remained  as  such  until the 1970s. They functioned together until the increase in enrolment of pupils led to a separation of the primary school in 1960. The primary schools were formerly known in Malay as Sekolah Kebangsaan St. John (1) and Sekolah Kebangsaan St. John (2) until the primary schools were officially merged again recently. The newly merged primary school is known today in Malay as Sekolah Kebangsaan St. John. The secondary school was called Sekolah Menengah Kebangsaan St. John, but it was announced in April 2016 that the name would be reverted to St John's Institution, a decision widely applauded by alumni and backed by another Johannian, Sultan Nazrin Shah of Perak.

SJI is among the first 30 schools selected into the Cluster School scheme when it was first introduced in 2007 by the Ministry of Education, Malaysia.

The La Sallian Brothers and the Board of Governors still hold much autonomy over management of the secondary school compared to the Malaysian Ministry of Education. This has allowed the secondary school to maintain a certain amount of prestige. Though the school land is owned by the Roman Catholic Church (including St. John's Cathedral, Kuala Lumpur which is next to the school), much of the school funding is received from the Government of Malaysia.

Site and architecture 
The main school building is located in Jalan Bukit Nanas, in the city centre of Kuala Lumpur, next to the Bukit Nanas forest reserve, giving it a lush surrounding. St. John's Primary Schools are located across the road from the main school building while the Convent Bukit Nanas, an Infant Jesus Sisters' school for the girls, the AIA building and the Archdiocese of Kuala Lumpur are located further down the road. The Fatima Kindergarten (housed in what is Kuala Lumpur's oldest catholic church and now converted into a community service centre) and the Roman Catholic St John's Cathedral are located on the road leading up to SJI.

The school is famous for its imposing red and white-brick main building with Grecian-Spanish influences. It was gazetted as a National Heritage site by the Government of Malaysia on 21 May 2010.

Administration 
The school has traditionally been headed by the Brothers of the La Sallian order, with a Brother Director (like a headmaster) and a Brother Supervisor (like a deputy headmaster). In recent years, the Brother Supervisor was replaced with three assistant principals, who are not in the La Sallian order.

Former Brother Directors are:

The headship of the school passed to the laity in 2002 when Peter Yii Sing Chiu became the first non-brother and non-Catholic to head the school.

Former principals are:

History
1904
 At the request of the Education Department and the then Bishop of Malacca, Mgr. Fee, the La Sallian Brothers opened a school in Kuala Lumpur. According to records, it started with an initial enrolment of 18 boys.
 Three days before classes were to commence on 18 January, three Brothers arrived to take charge of the school – Brother Julian Francis from Hong Kong, Brother Andrew Corsini from Burma and Brother Cyril Alexander from Penang.
 The school building was a two-storey wooden structure, 80 feet long and 20 feet wide, with a brick pillar and a verandah facing the north.
 Later in the year, Brother James Gilbert arrived from Singapore to take the place of Brother Julian Francis as Brother Director of SJI.

1905
 On 2 January, a Standard 7 was set up and entrusted to Brother Cyril Alexander.
 With this new set-up, expansion was needed. So Father Renard lent to the school the house of the Chinese Catechist which was capable of holding one class and also an attap shed near the site.

1906
 In June 1906, Brother Imier of Jesus, Provincial Visitor of the United States paid a visit to SJI. He later became Superior General in 1913.
 More classes were opened and accommodated on temporary structures.
 Finally the government provided a piece of land given to the mission for religious and educational purposes.
 On 3 November, the foundation stone for the new building was laid by Sir Henry Conway Belfield, Resident Councilor for Selangor.

1907
 At the end of the year, the new building was advanced enough to be used for the Cambridge Examination for all the candidates of Kuala Lumpur.

1908
 On 10 August, the new building was declared open by the High Commissioner and Governor, Sir John Anderson.

1914
 The Brothers' Building was enlarged by the addition of two new wings which were to house the chapel and offices and the Juniorate and Novitiate.
 Brother Marcian Cullen was appointed Director of the newly formed Juniorate.

1921
 Brother Stephen Edward Buckley demolished the Brothers' Building and replaced it with the present one, to which additions were made later.

1926
 Brother Louis installed a statue of Jean Baptist De La Salle on the front facade of the Main Block.

1930
 Brother Cornelius Nulty served as Brother Director from 1930 to 1946 and under his energetic management, many projects were brought to a successful conclusion.
 Brother Cornelius enlarged the playground, a project that was started by Brother Louis. He then turned his attention to the building of the hall which was finally completed in 1936 with the provision for two more storeys in the future.
 Brother Cornelius next built a new wing on the east side of the Brothers' Building, which became the Boarding Department (later De La Salle Institute, now St. John's International School)

1942–1945
 During World War II, SJI was closed but crowds of refugees flocked to Brother Cornelius for help and stayed in the school for security. When the war ended and peace returned, these refugees organised a scholarship fund to express gratitude to Brother Cornelius and to perpetuate his memory.

1948
 Brother D. Joseph Brophy established La Salle Sentul, La Salle Brickfields, La Salle Peel Road and La Salle Klang, which were intended as feeder schools for St John's.
 In SJI, he renovated the school hall as well as built a new cafeteria, space staff room and offices. A modern library was furnished and equipped and an extensive P.A. system was installed.

1953
 On 15 April, the first issue of the Term Review was on sale. The Term Review was the predecessor to the current editorial board of The Garudamas, the school magazine.

1954
 In the Golden Jubilee year, Brother D. Joseph achieved his final objective – the completion of the field extension.

1955
 Brother Tiberius Lawrence Spitzig starts his first term as Brother Director of SJI.
 The Dramatic Society staged its second play, 'Twelfth Night', and the newly formed school orchestra made its first public appearance at the play's public performance in the hall. Brother Celestine (later, Brother Director) was responsible for the success of the play.

1956
 Brother Lawrence renovated the school and added 14 classrooms at a cost of M$90,000

1957
 General Sir Francis Festing, Commander-in-Chief of the Far East visited SJI.

1958
 In accordance with a new government directive, a Board of Governors for the school was set up and the first meeting was held on 24 September. In the primary section, the Board of Managers held its first meeting on 13 March.

1959
 His Excellency Mgr John Gordon, Chargé d'Affaires of the Apostolic Delegation of Thailand and Malaya visited SJI on 27 January.
 Construction of the St John's Primary School began on the site of the Old Boys' Club. The building could accommodate 24 classes and would cost M$220,000

1960
 On 16 September, St John's Primary School was officially opened by Brother Fintan Blake.
 The new chapel on the middle floor of SJI was officially opened and used on 19 October.
1962

 Mr. Ng Eng Hiam, donated the new library in the Brothers' Quarters and founded the St. John's Institution Librarians.

1963
 The present school badge (designed by Brother Joseph McNally) was used, replacing the old badge by Brother Cornelius Nulty.

1965
 The Form 5 Block (or Arts Block) was officiated by the Archbishop of Kuala Lumpur, Mgr. Dominic Vendargon on 22 August.

1967
 The primary school hall, Dewan Tun Dr. Ismail was completed. A special ceremony was held to commemorate and dedicate the new hall on 15 February.

1969
 Brother Joseph Yeoh, a former Johannian returned to become the Brother Director. He was the first Malaysian to head the school. It was during his leadership that SJI achieved its glory years in academics and sports excellence.

1971
 The Main Block was given its current red and white colour scheme. The school was previously painted completely white in the 1960s.

1976
 Awards Day was introduced by Brother Joseph Yeoh to appreciate the service and achievements made by the students of SJI.

1979
 Brother Lawrence Spitzig returned as director of the school and presided over the school's Diamond Jubilee celebrations. Bro. Lawrence re-introduced the annual English and Bahasa Malaysia public speaking competition to the school. Public speaking became part of the English and Bahasa Malaysia curriculum and was compulsory for all students, resulting in SJI having many enabled and proficient public speakers amongst the students.

1984
 To kick off the 80th Anniversary of the founding of the school, Carnival Day and several projects were introduced to raise funds for the construction of a four-storey building adjacent to the science block to accommodate the lower and upper sixth form classes. This is the beginning of a series of fund raising projects initiated to upgrade the school and its facilities. Over the years, St John's has been blessed with generous contributions from its generations of former students and benefactors.

1988
 The new Form 6 Block was built and named Bangunan Tan Sri Dominic Vendargon (the Tan Sri Dominic Vendargon Building).
1991

 The third and current library was officially donated and opened on 13th January 1991 by Mr. Ng Thiam Weng, son of Mr. Ng Eng Hiam.

1994
 The sports complex comprising a badminton hall, three squash courts, and concourse was officiated by Brother David Liao on 18 January.

2002
 Brother Michael Wong, the last Brother Director of SJI retired, marking the end of the Brothers' directorship in SJI for 98 years.
 Mr. Peter Yii Sing Chiu, the first lay principal was appointed to head SJI.
 Being a Methodist, Mr. Peter Yii Sing Chiu is considered the first non-Catholic, non-Brother Director lay principal in St. John's.

2009
 St. John's receives its second lay principal, Mr. Leong Kum Loy.

2010
 St. John's is declared as a National Heritage Site by the Ministry of Culture, Arts and Heritage, Malaysia.
 St. John's receives its third lay principal, Mr. Lim Hean Hwa. He is a former student of St. John's under Brother Joseph Yeoh in the 1970s.

2011
 The restored tower clock on the Main Block, dedicated to the late Brother Lawrence Spitzig, was unveiled and officiated by former principal, Mr. Leong Kum Loy, in conjunction of St. John's 107th Birthday on 18 January. The project was an initiative by Megat Mizan Nicholas Denney, Chairman of the Board of Governors of St. John's.

2014
 St. John's receives its first non-Christian lay principal, Dr. M. Puvanendran. He was a Senior Assistant from 2005 - 2010.

2016
 St. John's Institution, one of the oldest secondary schools in Kuala Lumpur, has regained its right to be known by its old name and no longer as Sekolah Menengah Kebangsaan St John.
2022

 St. John's receives its first Catholic principal since 2002, Mr. Ravi Chandran a/l Krishnan.

The La Sallian heritage 
As St John's was founded by the La Sallian Brothers, it is related to many other La Sallian schools located all over Malaysia and around the world. These schools call each other brother schools and the La Sallian Heritage which binds them together.

St. John's Alumni Association (SJAA) 
The  St.  John's  Alumni  Association  Kuala  Lumpur  (1988)  or  SJAA  was  registered  as  an  official  body  with  the  Registrar  of  Society  Malaysia  on  7 August  1989.  SJAA  was  formed  as  a  continuation  of  the  previous  St. John's Old Boys Association (SJOBA)  and  Old Johannians Association (OJA)  to  foster  a  feeling  of  brotherhood,  mutual  goodwill,  understanding  among  the  alumni  of  St.  John's  Institution  Kuala  Lumpur  and  other  La  Sallian  Associations.  The  Alumni  conducts  its  core  activities  and  programs  to  promote  social,  cultural,  education  and  sports  activities  for  its  members  and  the  greater  good  of  all  Johannians.

Office  of  the  SJAA  consists  of  14  Elected  Members through  its  Annual  General  Meeting  on  a  two-year  term.  Together  with  the  other  stakeholders  of  St.  John's  Institution  Kuala  Lumpur,  members  of  the  Main  Committee  sits  on  a  monthly  basis  to  oversee  the  running  of  the  association,  programs  as  well  as  matters  relating  to  the  well-being  of  the  school  and  the  Alumni  members.

Uniformed bodies 
Some of the school uniformed bodies are the St John's Cadet Corps (Pasukan Kadet Bersatu Malaysia), St John's Naval Cadet Band, St John Ambulance, Eagle Scout Group, Red Crescent Society, Police Cadets, and Kadet Remaja Sekolah. Martial arts are also included in this category. They are the Taekwondo Club, Karate club, Fencing Club, Silat Gayung Club & Kendo Club.

8th Bukit Bintang KL Eagle Scout Group
The 8th Bukit Bintang KL Eagle Scout Group was established in 1963.

St John Ambulance of Malaysia (KL SJI A/C Div.) 
KL SJI A/C is a division under the St John Ambulance of Malaysia, part of an international voluntary service organisation dedicated to training and providing first aid skills. The division has had numerous achievements in competitions at the state and national levels, and continues to be a major contributor in voluntary first aid service around the capital.

St John's Institution Cadet Corps
The St John's Institution Cadet Corps was established in 1915, one of the oldest cadet corps in Malaya. It is the oldest cadet corps in this school formed by Lt. Eric Chart. It was under the command of the British Military Somerset Light Infantry during the colonial days.

St John's Institution Naval Cadet Band 
The St John's Institution Cadet Band was formed in 1916. The Cadet Band is also one of the few bands in Malaysia which include bagpipes in its ensemble.

In 2005 the St John's Institution Cadet Band Alumni was registered as an alumni body representing ex-band members.  Today the members continues their passion through the formation of the Alumni Band, mainly Pipe and Drums, performing at private functions. In history, the band won their first title as 1st place in the "KL State Marching Band Competition 2009". In that year also, the band was granted affiliation with the Royal Malaysian Navy.

St. John's Institution Drama Team 
The St John's Institution Drama Team or SJIDT was established in 2005. A revival of the original St. John's Institution Dramatic Society, which was discontinued in 1997 after a lack of productions. Currently under the purview of the Literature, Debate and Drama Club (LIDDRA), the drama team participates in various acting competitions both national and international. Former members continue to contribute to performing arts in Malaysia.

Sports 
St. John's has sports clubs that are open to students, including rugby, archery, football, hockey, badminton, basketball, sepak takraw, and fencing.

St. John's has five sports houses:

Claude (Blue House) - Fleur-de-lis
Cornelius (Red House) - Crown
D'Joseph (Green House) - Star
Gilbert (Brown House) - Bee
Stephen (Yellow House) - Shamrock

Notable Johannians 
 
 
 Aizat Amdan, singer and songwriter
 Zeti Akhtar Aziz, seventh Governor of Bank Negara Malaysia
 Hishammuddin Hussein, Malaysian Minister of Defence
 Hans Isaac, actor, entrepreneur
 Harith Iskander, artist and stand-up comedian
 Sudhir Rajagopalan, world martial arts champion and famed fashion designer 
 Chow Chee Keong, former national goalkeeper
 Faiz Khaleed, Military dentist, member of Angkasawan program
 Abdul Ghani Minhat, national football player
 Farish A. Noor, political scientist and human rights activist
 Najib Razak, the sixth Prime Minister of Malaysia
 Nazir Razak, Chairman, CIMB Group
 Syafiq Ridhwan, Asian Gold Medalist, World Bowling Champion
 Sultan Sharafuddin Idris Shah, Sultan of Selangor
 Sultan Nazrin Muizzuddin Shah, Sultan of Perak
 Tengku Mohamad Rizam, Tengku Temenggong of Kelantan
Senator Datuk Ras Adiba Radzi, Member of the Upper/August House, Parliament of Malaysia & Chairman of BERNAMA
 Afdlin Shauki, film director

See also 
 Saint John Baptist de La Salle
 De La Salle Christian Brothers

Citations 
 The school history is obtained from the Golden Jubilee school magazine (1954), Diamond Jubilee Souvenir book (1964), 75th Anniversary Commemorative book (1979) and 100 Years Centenary coffee table book (2004).

References

External links
 St. John's Institution

Primary schools in Malaysia
Secondary schools in Malaysia
Educational institutions established in 1904
Lasallian schools in Malaysia
Catholic schools in Malaysia
1904 establishments in British Malaya
Boys' schools in Malaysia
Publicly funded schools in Malaysia